Scirpophaga lineata is a moth in the family Crambidae. It was described by Arthur Gardiner Butler in 1879. It is found in China (Jiangxi, Hainan, Yunnan), Japan, India, Malaysia and Indonesia.

The larvae feed on Oryza sativa.

References

Moths described in 1879
Schoenobiinae
Moths of Asia